Wali al-Ahd is the Arabic and Islamic term for a designated heir of a ruler, or crown prince.

Origin of the title
The title emerged in the early caliphates, and can be traced to at least . The Umayyad caliphs (661–750) certainly favoured a more absolutist interpretation, by which they claimed a mandate deriving directly from God, via their position as heirs to Muhammad. By the 740s, the term , or even the variant  ('successor to the covenant of the Muslim men and Muslim women') appears in use, either in the sense of the Muslim community pledging allegiance to the heir-designate, or the heir being the successor to the covenant with the Muslim community. The term was established as the usual title of the caliphal heir-apparent by the time of the first Abbasid caliphs (750–1258).

Practice of designation
The origin of the practice has pre-Islamic roots, among the choice of successor in the Arab tribes. In the Islamic period, this ancient practice was given new legitimacy when the first caliph, Abu Bakr, nominated his successor, Caliph Umar. Umar in turn later nominated a group of prominent Muslims to choose one of their number as his successor. The choice of heir was set on a hereditary basis by the first Umayyad caliph, Mu'awiya I, who chose his own son, Yazid I. The hereditary principle prevailed thereafter, although sometimes a brother could be chosen instead, or multiple sons be nominated as first and second heir; though usually the latter practice led to succession disputes. In Sunni jurisprudence, the choice of successor and the act of designation is the absolute prerogative of the caliph or ruler; the oath of allegiance offered to the new heir confirmed his status, but was not a prerequisite for his legitimacy. 

This designation was made manifest through a testament. In the Umayyad period, this was a relatively informal matter, and often the designation of an heir-apparent was made public only after the incumbent caliph's death.  In the Abbasid period, this became a formalized and increasingly elaborate affair, deserving of a special ceremony, in which the new heir-designate also received the pledge of allegiance from the assembled court. After that, he received his own insignia and a regnal name, by which he was named in the Friday prayer, on banners and on coinage, alongside the caliph. If still underage, the heir-designate received a tutor, and he was later sent to govern a province in order to gain experience. In the early Abbasid period, heirs served as regents during the caliphs' absence from Baghdad.

Later usage
The title was used by several medieval Islamic states, such as the Fatimid Caliphate, the Seljuk Empire, the Buyid dynasty, Mamluk Egypt, and in al-Andalus. Following al-Hakim's murder in 1021, both heirs were sidelined and the succession to both offices united in the person of al-Hakim's son, al-Zahir.

In modern times, the term has been revived for the crown princes of several states, such as the Qajar and Pahlavi Iran, Saudi Arabia, Jordan, Qatar and Bahrein.

See also
 Crown prince
 Şehzade

References

Sources
 
 
 

Arabic words and phrases
Heirs to the throne
Crown princes
Heirs apparent
Government of the Fatimid Caliphate
Government of the Abbasid Caliphate
Government of the Umayyad Caliphate